The Final Table is an American cooking competition and reality television series hosted by food writer and critic Andrew Knowlton, and filmed in Los Angeles, California for Netflix. The first season was released  on November 20, 2018. It features twelve international teams of two professional chefs each competing to create elevated dishes based on the country chosen for each episode. The first round is judged by a three-person panel—a food critic, and two culturally significant citizens, all representing the episode's country—assessing each team's interpretation of their chosen nationally significant dish. Interspersed among the cooking activities are video packages featuring the culinary biographies of the contestants.

The second round of each episode is The Final Plate Challenge. A chef, who already has an honorary seat at The Final Table, picks an ingredient representing their country's cooking culture, and then judges each team's dish highlighting that ingredient, eliminating one or two teams. In the first seven episodes, the bottom three teams are up for elimination in the second round, in the eighth and ninth episodes, only one team is not up for elimination.

For the finale, the nine renowned chef judges from each episode return, and are featured at The Final Table along with signature dishes they had each created that changed the food world. The final two competing chef teams break up and compete as individuals. Each of the four contestants must prepare a signature dish that defines them as a chef, and will “cause ripples around the culinary world”.

Chefs
Each chef was paired with a fellow chef that they knew from their personal or professional life before the event. The 12 teams were:

Episodes

Season 1

Contestants' progress

 The contestants cooked the best dishes in the challenge.
 The contestants were nominated, but cooked the best dish of the final plate round.
 The contestants were nominated, but they weren't eliminated and they didn't cook the best dish of the final plate round.
 The contestants were eliminated in the final plate round.
 The contestants were safe.
 The winner was part of the team.
 The contestants were finalists, but did not win.
 The contestants were already eliminated in previous episodes.

Notes

Reception

Critical response
Upon release, the show received a mixed response from critics. On review aggregation website Rotten Tomatoes, the series holds a 50% approval rating based on 6 reviews, with an average rating of 4.67 out of 10.

In a review for The Guardian, critic Lucy Mangan described the show as "bombastic and barely watchable", giving the show two out of five stars. In a more positive review, David Sexton wrote in the Evening Standard that fans of MasterChef will "love this". David Levesley of GQ noted the high and low points of the show, writing that it contained "the perfect blend of trash and intellect".

Awards and nominations

References

External links
 
 

2018 American television series debuts
English-language Netflix original programming
Food reality television series
American cooking television series
Television shows filmed in Los Angeles
Reality competition television series